Rick Meissen  (born 24 February 2002) is a Dutch footballer who plays for as a central defender for Eredivisie club Sparta Rotterdam.

Career
Meissen moved from AVV Zeeburgia to FC Utrecht in the summer of 2016. On 25 February 2020 he signed his first professional contract with Utrecht signing until the summer of 2023, with the option of an extra year. He made his Eerste Divisie debut on 19 March 2021 against Helmond Sport. Meissen made his Eredivisie debut on 13 March 2022 at home against PSV Eindhoven in a 1-0 defeat.

On 30 January 2023, Meissen signed for Sparta Rotterdam on a three-and-a-half year deal.

References

External links
 

2002 births
Living people
Dutch footballers
Association football defenders
FC Utrecht players
Sparta Rotterdam players
Eerste Divisie players
Eredivisie players